Margot Béziat (born 30 July 2001) is a French female canoeist who won four medals at senior level at the Wildwater Canoeing World Championships.

Medals at the World Championships
Senior

References

External links
 

2001 births
Living people
French female canoeists
Place of birth missing (living people)